Itsakar is a village in the Berd Municipality of the Tavush Province of Armenia.

References

External links 

Populated places in Tavush Province